USS Spark may refer to:

, a privateer built in 1813
, purchased by the US Navy in 1831
, laid down as LST-340 on 17 July 1942

United States Navy ship names